The 2014 EBSA European Under-21 Snooker Championships took place in Bucharest, Romania between 18 and 23 March 2014. It was won by fourteenth seed Englishman Oliver Lines who defeated twentieth seed Republic of Irishman Josh Boileau 6–1 in the final. For winning the tournament, Oliver Lines was rewarded with a place in the 2014/15 snooker season.

Results

References

2014 in snooker
Snooker amateur tournaments
Sports competitions in Bucharest
2014 in Romanian sport
International sports competitions hosted by Romania
2010s in Bucharest
March 2014 sports events in Romania